is a Japanese film director, film producer and screenwriter. He has directed over one hundred theatrical, video, and television productions since his debut in 1991. His films run through a variety of different genres, and range from violent and bizarre to dramatic and family-friendly movies. He is a controversial figure in the contemporary Japanese cinema industry, with several of his films being criticised for their extreme graphic violence. Some of his best known films are Audition, Ichi the Killer, Gozu, One Missed Call, the Dead or Alive trilogy, and various remakes: Graveyard of Honor, Hara-kiri and 13 Assassins.

Early life 
Miike was born in Yao, Osaka Prefecture, to a Nikkei family originally from the Kumamoto Prefecture, on the island of Kyushu. During World War II, his grandfather was stationed in China and Korea, and his father was born in Seoul in today's South Korea. His father worked as a welder and his mother as a seamstress. Although he claimed to have attended classes only rarely, he graduated from Yokohama Vocational School of Broadcast and Film (Yokohama Hōsō Eiga Senmon Gakkō) under the guidance of renowned filmmaker Shohei Imamura, the founder and Dean of that institution.

Career 
Miike's first films were television productions, but he also began directing several direct-to-video V-Cinema releases. Miike still directs V-Cinema productions intermittently due to the creative freedom afforded by the less stringent censorship of the medium and the riskier content that the producers will allow.

Miike's theatrical debut was the film The Third Gangster (Daisan no gokudō), but Shinjuku Triad Society (1995) was his first theatrical release to gain public attention. The film showcased his extreme style and his recurring themes, and its success allowed him to work on higher-budgeted pictures. Shinjuku Triad Society was the first film in what is labeled his "Black Society Trilogy", which also includes Rainy Dog (1997) and Ley Lines (1999). He gained international fame in 2000 when his romantic horror film Audition (1999), his violent yakuza epic Dead or Alive (1999), and his controversial adaptation of the manga Ichi the Killer played at international film festivals. He has since gained a strong cult following in the West that is growing with the increase in DVD releases of his works. His film Hara-Kiri: Death of a Samurai premiered In Competition at the 2011 Cannes Film Festival. His 2013 film Straw Shield was nominated for the Palme d'Or at the 2013 Cannes Film Festival.

Themes of his work 
Miike achieved notoriety for depicting shocking scenes of extreme violence and sexual perversions. Many of his films contain graphic and lurid bloodshed, often portrayed in an over-the-top, cartoonish manner. Much of his work depicts the activities of criminals (especially yakuza) or concern themselves with gaijin, non-Japanese or foreigners living in Japan. He is known for his dark sense of humor and for pushing the boundaries of censorship as far as they will go.

Miike has directed films in a range of genres. He has created lighthearted children's films (Ninja Kids!!!, The Great Yokai War), period pieces (Sabu), a road movie (The Bird People in China), a teen drama (Andromedia), a farcical musical-comedy-horror (The Happiness of the Katakuris), video game adaptations (Like a Dragon, Ace Attorney), and character-driven crime dramas (Ley Lines and Agitator).

While Miike often creates films that are less accessible and target arthouse audiences and fans of extreme cinema, such as Izo and the "Box" segment in Three... Extremes, he has created several mainstream and commercial titles such as the horror film One Missed Call and the fantasy drama The Great Yokai War.

Miike has cited Starship Troopers as his favorite film. He expressed admiration for directors Akira Kurosawa, Hideo Gosha, David Lynch, David Cronenberg, and Paul Verhoeven.

Controversies 
Several of Miike's films have been subject to scrutiny due to heavy violence. His 2001 horror film Ichi the Killer, adapted from a manga of the same name and starring Tadanobu Asano as a sadomasochistic yakuza enforcer, was highly controversial; during its international premiere at the Toronto International Film Festival in 2001, the audience received "barf bags" emblazoned with the film's logo as a promotional gimmick. The British Board of Film Classification refused to allow the release of the film uncut in the United Kingdom, citing its extreme levels of sexual violence towards women; the film required 3 minutes and 15 seconds of mandated cuts to be allowed release. In Hong Kong, 16 minutes and 59 seconds of footage were cut. Ichi the Killer was also banned outright in Norway, Germany and Malaysia.

In 2005, Miike was invited to direct an episode of the Masters of Horror anthology series. The series, featuring episodes by a range of established horror directors such as John Carpenter, Tobe Hooper and Dario Argento, was supposed to provide directors with relative creative freedom and relaxed restrictions on violent and sexual content (some sexual content was edited from the Argento-directed episode "Jenifer"). However, when the Showtime cable network acquired the rights to the series, Miike's episode, "Imprint", was deemed too disturbing for the network. Showtime cancelled it from the broadcast lineup even after extended negotiations, though it was retained as part of the series' DVD release. Mick Garris, creator and executive producer of the series, described the episode as "amazing, but hard even for me to watch... definitely the most disturbing film I've ever seen".

While "Imprint" has yet to air in the United States, it has aired on Bravo in the United Kingdom, on FX in Mexico, South and Central America, the Dominican Republic, France, Israel, Turkey, on Nelonen in Finland, and on Rai Tre in Italy. Anchor Bay Entertainment, which has handled the DVD releases for the Masters of Horror series in the US, released "Imprint" uncut on Region 1 DVD on September 26, 2006.

Filmography

As director

As actor 
Young Thugs: Innocent Blood (1997), as man in red trousers getting beaten up by Riichi
Agitator (2001), as Shinozaki
Graveyard of Honor (2001), as Restaurant gunman
Ichi the Killer: Episode 0 (2002), Kakihara (voice)
Last Life in the Universe (2003), as Yakuza
Neighbour No. 13 (2005), as Kaneda
Hostel (2006), as Miike Takashi
Dōbutsu no Mori (2006), as Rokusuke/Pascal (voice)
Tenchijin (2009), as Hyogo Kariyasu
No More Heroes 2: Desperate Struggle (2010), as himself, a friend of Bishop (voice)
No More Heroes III (2021), voiced by Stephen Oyoung

As producer 
The Making of 'Gemini' (2000)
Ryu ga Gotoku (2006)

Other work 
In 2005 Takashi Miike directed a Kabuki-style play titled Demon Pond. The DVD recording of the performance was released by Cinema Epoch.

References

Further reading 
Mes, Tom. Agitator: The Cinema of Takashi Miike. Godalming: FAB Press, 2003. 
Williams, Tony. "Takashi Miike's Cinema of Outrage." cineACTION 64 (2004): 54–62
"Izo: Takashi Miike's History Lesson." Asian Cinema 16.2 (2005): 85–109.
Gerow, Aaron. "The Homelessness of Style and the Problems of Studying Miike Takashi." Canadian Journal of Film Studies 18.1 (2009): 24–43

External links 

Suicide is for the Birds: Takashi Miike's Tales of De-territorializing Flight at Fantasia 2003 and Beyond
2002 Interview at the Brussels International Festival of Fantastic Film
SuicideGirls interview with Miike by Daniel Robert Epstein

Interview with Takashi Miike by Mark Schilling
Interview with Takashi Miike on Midnight Eye
Interview with Miike regarding his Yakuza work on 1UP.com 
Another Decade with Takashi Miike: An Introduction
 PULP : : The Manga Magazine : : 6.01 What's No. 5?
 PULP : : The Manga Magazine : : 5.07 Feature
 PULP : : The Manga Magazine : : 5.07 Feature
 PULP : : The Manga Magazine : : THE WOUNDED MAN INTERVIEW

1960 births
Living people
Fantasy film directors
Horror film directors
Japanese film directors
Japanese male film actors
Japanese male actors of Korean descent
People from Yao, Osaka
Samurai film directors
Yakuza film directors
Film controversies in Japan